Pirasora (also, Pirasora) is a village and the most populous municipality, other than the capital Lerik, in the Lerik Rayon of Azerbaijan. It has a population of 2,298.

References

External links

Populated places in Lerik District